Pauline van den Driessche (born 1941) is a British and Canadian applied mathematician who is a professor emerita in the department of mathematics and statistics at the University of Victoria, where she has also held an affiliation in the department of computer science. Her research interests include mathematical biology, matrix analysis, and stability theory.

Education and career
Van den Driessche earned bachelor's and master's degrees in 1961 and 1963 respectively from Imperial College London. She completed her doctorate in 1964 from the University College of Wales; her dissertation concerned fluid mechanics. She stayed on for a year in Wales as an assistant lecturer;
she was hired as an assistant professor at the University of Victoria in 1965, and retired in 2006.

Contributions
In mathematical biology, van den Driessche's contributions include important work on delay differential equations and on Hopf bifurcations, and the effects of changing population size and immigration on epidemics.

She has also done more fundamental research in linear algebra, motivated by applications in mathematical biology. Her work in this area includes pioneering contributions to the theory of combinatorial matrix theory in which she proved connections between the sign pattern of a matrix and its stability, as well as results on matrix decomposition.

Awards and honors
In 2005, the journal Linear Algebra and its Applications published a special issue in her honor. She was the 2007 winner of the Krieger–Nelson Prize of the Canadian Mathematical Society, and in the same year became the inaugural Olga Taussky-Todd Lecturer, an award given every four years at the International Congress on Industrial and Applied Mathematics by the International Council for Industrial and Applied Mathematics and Association for Women in Mathematics.
In 2013 she became a fellow of the Society for Industrial and Applied Mathematics "for contributions to linear algebra and mathematical biology". She received the CAIMS Research Prize from the Canadian Applied and Industrial Mathematics Society in 2019, and the  2022 Hans Schneider Prize in Linear Algebra.

References

1941 births
Living people
British computer scientists
British women computer scientists
British mathematicians
Canadian computer scientists
Canadian women computer scientists
British women mathematicians
Canadian women mathematicians
20th-century British mathematicians
21st-century British mathematicians
20th-century Canadian mathematicians
21st-century Canadian mathematicians
Alumni of Imperial College London
Alumni of Aberystwyth University
Academics of Aberystwyth University
Academic staff of the University of Victoria
Fellows of the Society for Industrial and Applied Mathematics
20th-century women mathematicians
21st-century women mathematicians
20th-century Canadian women scientists